Juicing is the process of extracting juice from plant tissues such as fruit or vegetables.

Overview 

There are many methods of juicing, from squeezing fruit by hand to wide-scale extraction with industrial equipment. Juicing is generally the preferred method of consuming large amounts of produce quickly and is often completed with a household appliance called a juicer, which may be as simple as a cone upon which fruit is mashed or as sophisticated as a variable-speed, motor-driven device. It may also refer to the act of extracting and then drinking juice or those who extract the juice.

Juicing is different from buying juice in the supermarket because it focuses on fresh pressed fruits and vegetables. Residential juicing is often practiced for dietary reasons or as a form of alternative medicine. Becoming first popular in the early 1970s, interest in juicing has since increased.  Films such as Fat, Sick and Nearly Dead, Food Matters, and Hungry for Change have increased the sales of juicers.

In America, juicing was popularized by Gayelord Hauser, Jay Kordich and Norman W. Walker.

Methods 
Juicing tools have been used throughout history. Manual devices include barrel-shaped presses, hand-operated grinders, and inverted cones upon which fruit is mashed and twisted. Modern juicers are powered by electric motors generating from 200 to 1000 or more watts. There are several types of electric juicers: masticating, centrifugal, and triturating juicers. These variations are defined by the means of extracting the juice.
 Masticating (also referred to as cold pressed) – utilizes a single gear driven by a motor; slower operation; kneads and grinds items placed in a chute
 Centrifugal – (also referred to as high-speed juicing) – utilizes a spinning blade that resembles a grated basket; faster operation; quickly grinds items and discards pulp in a receptacle
Triturating – utilizes twin gears; slower operation; often has multiple uses

Health effects 
Longitudinal prospective cohort studies conducted at Harvard showed an increased risk of Type 2 diabetes when fruit juice is consumed. Comparatively, consuming whole fruits significantly reduced the risk, suggesting that juicing process may not be beneficial to prevent diabetes. Similarly, consumption of whole apples helped lower cholesterol levels, while clear apple juice did not have such an effect.

The American Journal of Public Health proposed that the Healthy Hunger-Free Kids Act of 2010 in the United States eliminate 100% fruit juices since it has been linked to childhood obesity, and substitute instead with whole fruits.

Juicing removes the fiber content of the fruit or vegetable, and the full benefits of the plant is thus not experienced. Re-adding fiber to the juice cannot be equated to whole fruits. There is a loss in non-extracted polyphenols, a class of phytonutrients, in fruit juice compared to whole plant foods. Most polyphenols are bound to the plant fibers, and constitute the major portion of dietary polyphenols. There is therefore a marked loss of phytonutrients in consuming fruits and vegetables through the juicing process alone.

The American Cancer Society says, "there is no convincing scientific evidence that extracted juices are healthier than whole foods".

Juicing may not be the best way to extract all of the nutritional value from fruits and vegetables. According to Uckoo, when juiced grapefruit was compared with blended, the latter was superior. Smoothies, which are the blending of fruit into juice, not the extraction, leave pulp and seeds within the drink leading to better nutrition.

See also 

 Health food
 Healthy diet
 Jack LaLanne
 List of ineffective cancer treatments
 Juice fasting
 Juicer
 Max Gerson
 Norman Walker
 Smoothie

References 

Cooking techniques
Raw foodism
Juice